According to Model Disability Survey of Afghanistan by the Asia Foundation in 2019, there were around 80% of adults in Afghanistan which had some forms of disabilities.

Distributions
Among those with disability, 24.6% experienced mild disability, 40.4% experienced moderate disability and 13.9% experienced severe disability. For severe disabilities, the prevalent areas of distribution are West (25.4%), Central Highlands (25.4%) and South East region (20.5%). Those with moderate and severe disabilities, the majority of the obstacles faced by them are mobility, socializing, employment and education.

References